The following is a List of communist parties represented in European Parliament. This list does not contain communist parties previously represented in European Parliament. This article lists only those parties who officially call themselves communist ideologically. Seven communist parties have been elected to European Parliament in seven different countries.

List

Sources
 Official Register of MEPs

See also
List of communist parties
2019 European Parliament election
European United Left–Nordic Green Left
Party of the European Left
Initiative of Communist and Workers' Parties

Communist parties in Europe
Communist parties represented in European Parliament
European Parliament